Tarciane Karen dos Santos de Lima (born 27 May 2003), simply known as Tarciane, is a Brazilian professional footballer who plays as a central defender for Corinthians and the Brazil women's national team.

Club career
Tarciane was born in Belford Roxo, Rio de Janeiro, and joined Fluminense's youth setup in 2019, from a local project called Daminhas da Bola. She immediately started to play with the main squad, while also featuring for the under-18 team.

On 21 June 2021, Tarciane asked to leave Flu, and signed for Corinthians until the end of 2022. On 16 December 2022, she renewed her contract until 2024.

International career
After representing Brazil at under-17 and under-20 levels, Tarciane was called up for the full side by manager Pia Sundhage on 22 September 2022, for friendlies against Norway and Italy. She made her full international debut on 7 October, coming on as a half-time substitute for Kathellen in a 4–1 win against the former in Oslo.

Honours

Club
Corinthians
Campeonato Brasileiro de Futebol Feminino Série A1: 2021, 2022
Campeonato Paulista de Futebol Feminino: 2021
Copa Libertadores Femenina: 2021
Supercopa do Brasil de Futebol Feminino: 2022
: 2022

International
Brazil U20
South American Under-20 Women's Football Championship: 2022

References

2003 births
Living people
Sportspeople from Rio de Janeiro (state)
Brazilian women's footballers
Women's association football defenders
Campeonato Brasileiro de Futebol Feminino Série A1 players
Sport Club Corinthians Paulista (women) players
Brazil women's international footballers
People from Bedford Roxo